Events from the year 1526 in India.

Events
 21 April – The First Battle of Panipat is fought. Babur becomes Mughal emperor, invades northern India and captures Delhi, beginning the Mughal Empire, which lasts until 1857.
 Date unknown – The Siege of Sambhal occurs.
 Date unclear – The Siege of Calicut.
 Henrique de Meneses ends his governance of Portuguese India
 Lopo Vaz de Sampaio begins his governance of Portuguese India (which ends in 1529)
 Bahadur Shah of Gujarat first reign as sultan of Gujarat Sultanate begins (ends 1535)

Births

Deaths
 21 April – Ibrahim Lodi, sultan of Delhi (birth date unknown)

See also

 Timeline of Indian history

References